Xu Wei (born 27 January 1995) is a female Chinese badminton player.

Achievements

BWF International Challenge/Series
Women's Singles

 BWF International Challenge tournament
 BWF International Series tournament
 BWF Future Series tournament

References

External links
 

Chinese female badminton players
1995 births
Living people